B. Ibrahim (born 2 January 1946) is an Indian politician and former member of Rajya Sabha (the upper house of the Parliament of India) from 1980 to 1984.

Early life and background 
Ibrahim was born on 2nd January 1946. He completed his education in B.A., B.L.

Personal life 
Ibrahim married to Zohra Ibrahim and the couple has 2 daughters.

Position held

References 

Living people
1946 births
Indian politicians
Rajya Sabha members from Karnataka
Indian National Congress politicians from Karnataka
Karnataka politicians